Stobrawa may refer to:
Stobrawa (potato), a Polish potato variety
Stobrawa Landscape Park, a protected area around the Stobrawa river in south-west Poland
Stobrawa, Opole Voivodeship, a village in south-west Poland